is a Japanese mixed martial artist, professional wrestler, and the former executive president of Pancrase Inc. A professional MMA competitor from 2005 until 2014, Kawamura most notably competed for Pancrase, where he is the former King of Pancrase Middleweight Champion and Light Heavyweight Champion. In MMA, also competed for World Victory Road and ONE FC.

Kawamura at the time when he was executive president founded the "Commission Council" as a third-party organization. He carried out structural reforms in Pancrase.

Debuting in professional wrestling for Dramatic Dream Team's Hard Hit brand in 2012, he has wrestled in promotions like All Japan Pro Wrestling, Real Japan Pro Wrestling, Kaientai Dojo and Pro Wrestling Heat Up. He wrestles as "Rocky Kawamura".

Personal life
He is the current executive playing Manager of Pancrase Inc.

Championships and accomplishments

Mixed martial arts
Pancrase
Light Heavyweight King of Pancrase (one time; former)
Three successful title defenses
Middleweight King of Pancrase (two times; former)
One successful title defense (first reign)
Pancrase 2012 Middleweight Tournament Winner
Pancrase 2006 Neo Blood Tournament Winner (Light Heavyweight)

Professional wrestling
Tokyo Gurentai
Tokyo Intercontinental Tag Team Championship (1 time) – with Hikaru Sato

Mixed martial arts record

|-
| Loss
| align=center| 19–11–4
|Yura Naito
|KO (punch)
|Pancrase 326
|
|align=center|1
|align=center|0:42
|Tokyo, Japan
|
|-
| Win
| align=center| 19–10–4
| Yuji Arai
| KO (knee and punches)
| Pancrase 323
| 
| align=center| 1
| align=center| 3:03
| Tokyo, Japan
|
|-
| Loss
| align=center| 18–10–4
| Yuki Niimura
| KO (punch)
| Pancrase 291
| 
| align=center| 3
| align=center| 0:43
| Tokyo, Japan
| 
|-
| Win
| align=center| 18–9–4
| Yuki Niimura
| TKO (punches)
| Pancrase 281
| 
| align=center| 2
| align=center| 1:30
| Tokyo, Japan
| 
|-
| Win
| align=center| 17–9–4
| Givago Francisco
| Decision (unanimous)
| Pancrase 273
| 
| align=center| 3
| align=center| 3:00
| Tokyo, Japan
|
|-
| Loss
| align=center| 16–9–4
| Shinsho Anzai
| TKO (punches)
| Pancrase 259
| 
| align=center| 1
| align=center| 2:52
| Tokyo, Japan
| 
|-
| Win
| align=center| 16–8–4
| Kazuo Takahashi
| TKO (punches)
| Pancrase 252: 20th Anniversary
| 
| align=center| 1
| align=center| 1:43
| Yokohama, Kanagawa, Japan
| 
|-
| Loss
| align=center| 15–8–4
| Dool Hee Lee
| Decision (split)
| Road FC 012
| 
| align=center| 3
| align=center| 5:00
| Wonju, Gangwon, South Korea
| 
|-
| Loss
| align=center| 15–7–4
| Melvin Manhoef
| KO (punch)
| ONE Fighting Championship: Rise of Kings
| 
| align=center| 1
| align=center| 4:40
| Kallang, Singapore
| 
|-
| Win
| align=center| 15–6–4
| Shungo Oyama
| KO (Soccer Kick)
| Pancrase: Progress Tour 7
| 
| align=center| 1
| align=center| 4:19
| Tokyo, Japan
| 
|-
| Win
| align=center| 14–6–4
| Ikkei Nagamura
| KO (Knee)
| Pancrase: Progress Tour 1
| 
| align=center| 2
| align=center| 2:18
| Tokyo, Japan
| 
|-
| Win
| align=center| 13–6–4
| Yuji Hisamatsu
| Decision (Unanimous)
| Pancrase: Progress Tour 1
| 
| align=center| 2
| align=center| 5:00
| Tokyo, Japan
| 
|-
| Draw
| align=center| 12–6–4
| Ikkei Nagamura
| Draw
| Pancrase: Impressive Tour 5
| 
| align=center| 2
| align=center| 5:00
| Tokyo, Japan
| 
|-
| Draw
| align=center| 12–6–3
| Yuji Sakuragi
| Draw
| Pancrase: Passion Tour 11
| 
| align=center| 3
| align=center| 5:00
| Tokyo, Japan
| 
|-
| Loss
| align=center| 12–6–2
| Yuji Sakuragi
| TKO (Punches)
| Pancrase: Passion Tour 8
| 
| align=center| 1
| align=center| 3:55
| Tokyo, Japan
| 
|-
| Win
| align=center| 12–5–2
| Hidetada Irie
| TKO (Punches)
| World Victory Road Presents: Sengoku Raiden Championships 13
| 
| align=center| 2
| align=center| 3:00
| Tokyo, Japan
| 
|-
| Win
| align=center| 11–5–2
| Shunsuke Inoue
| Decision (Majority)
| Pancrase: Changing Tour 8
| 
| align=center| 3
| align=center| 5:00
| Tokyo, Japan
| 
|-
| Loss
| align=center| 10–5–2
| Fábio Silva
| TKO (Corner Stoppage)
| World Victory Road Presents: Sengoku 10
| 
| align=center| 1
| align=center| 2:28
| Saitama, Japan
| 
|-
| Win
| align=center| 10–4–2
| Yukiya Naito
| Decision (Unanimous)
| Pancrase: Changing Tour 3
| 
| align=center| 3
| align=center| 5:00
| Tokyo, Japan
| 
|-
| Loss
| align=center| 9–4–2
| Muhammed Lawal
| Decision (Unanimous)
| World Victory Road Presents: Sengoku 7
| 
| align=center| 3
| align=center| 5:00
| Tokyo, Japan
| 
|-
| Win
| align=center| 9–3–2
| Keiichiro Yamamiya
| Decision (Unanimous)
| Pancrase: Shining 8
| 
| align=center| 3
| align=center| 5:00
| Tokyo, Japan
| 
|-
| Loss
| align=center| 8–3–2
| Kevin Randleman
| Decision (Unanimous)
| World Victory Road Presents: Sengoku 2
| 
| align=center| 3
| align=center| 5:00
| Tokyo, Japan
|Return to Light Heavyweight.
|-
| Win
| align=center| 8–2–2
| Antônio Braga Neto
| Decision (Unanimous)
| World Victory Road Presents: Sengoku First Battle
| 
| align=center| 3
| align=center| 5:00
| Tokyo, Japan
|Middleweight debut.
|-
| Loss
| align=center| 7–2–2
| Keiichiro Yamamiya
| Decision (Unanimous)
| Pancrase: Rising 10
| 
| align=center| 3
| align=center| 5:00
| Tokyo, Japan
| 
|-
| Win
| align=center| 7–1–2
| Jaime Fletcher
| KO (Soccer Kick)
| Pancrase: Rising 6
| 
| align=center| 1
| align=center| 1:36
| Tokyo, Japan
| 
|-
| Loss
| align=center| 6–1–2
| Fábio Silva
| KO (Punches)
| Pancrase: Rising 5
| 
| align=center| 2
| align=center| 3:44
| Tokyo, Japan
| 
|-
| Win
| align=center| 6–0–2
| Hiromitsu Kanehara
| KO (Punches)
| Pancrase: Rising 3
| 
| align=center| 3
| align=center| 1:36
| Tokyo, Japan
| 
|-
| Draw
| align=center| 5–0–2
| Nilson de Castro
| Draw
| Pancrase: Blow 11
| 
| align=center| 3
| align=center| 5:00
| Tokyo, Japan
| 
|-
| Win
| align=center| 5–0–1
| Daniel Acacio
| KO (Punch)
| Pancrase: Blow 7
| 
| align=center| 2
| align=center| 2:40
| Tokyo, Japan
| 
|-
| Win
| align=center| 4–0–1
| Sumio Koyano
| KO (Punches)
| Pancrase: 2006 Neo-Blood Tournament Finals
| 
| align=center| 1
| align=center| 1:15
| Tokyo, Japan
| 
|-
| Win
| align=center| 3–0–1 
| Yuta Watanabe
| KO (Punch)
| Pancrase: 2006 Neo-Blood Tournament Semifinals
| 
| align=center| 1
| align=center| 2:35
| Tokyo, Japan
| 
|-
| Draw
| align=center| 2–0–1 
| Yuta Watanabe
| Draw
| Pancrase: Blow 1
| 
| align=center| 2
| align=center| 5:00
| Tokyo, Japan
| 
|-
| Win
| align=center| 2–0 
| Sumio Koyano
| Decision (Unanimous)
| Pancrase: Spiral 10
| 
| align=center| 2
| align=center| 5:00
| Tokyo, Japan
| 
|-
| Win
| align=center| 1–0
| Yusaku Tsukumo
| Decision (Unanimous)
| GCM: Demolition 05/07/27
| 
| align=center| 2
| align=center| 5:00
| Tokyo, Japan
|

See also
 List of current mixed martial arts champions
 List of male mixed martial artists

References

External links

1981 births
Living people
Japanese male mixed martial artists
Middleweight mixed martial artists
Mixed martial artists utilizing wrestling
Japanese male professional wrestlers